Guy Loraine Bond (May 4, 1904 – 1980) was an educational psychologist who made significant contributions to research in reading and literacy. Bond's work with Robert Dykstra on The First Grade Studies is perhaps the most famous of his contributions. His areas of study were reading, elementary education, and curriculum education psychology.

Born in Coupeville, Washington, Bond was educated at Western Washington State College and the Universities of Alabama and Columbia. Bond was a professor at State College, Fredonia, New York from 1936–1937. He was a professor in the Faculty of Education at the University of Minnesota from 1942 to 1971, where an endowed faculty chair was established in his name.

Publications 
 Reading Difficulties: Their Diagnosis and Correction by Guy L. Bond and Miles A. Tinker, 1951
 The Cooperative Resesarch Program in First-Grade Reading Instruction (Bond & Dykstra, 1967)
 Developmental reading in high school by Guy L. Bond and Eva Bond, New York, The Macmillan Company, 1941
 Review of Teaching the child to Read by Nina Jacob, Guy L. Bond and Eva Bond, "The Elementary School Journal", Mar 1944, vol 44, no 7, p430-431 
 Teaching the child to read by Guy L. Bond and Eva Bond Wagner, New York, The Macmillan Company, 1958

External links 
 The First Grade Studies
 Literacy’s legacy, College of Education and Human Development Centennial Magazine, Winter 2006

References

1904 births
1980 deaths
Educational psychologists
20th-century American psychologists
People from Coupeville, Washington
American educational psychologists
American psychologists